Cooking Lake is a lake in Alberta, Canada. It is located in Strathcona County, east-southeast of Edmonton. Edmonton/Cooking Lake Water Aerodrome is located on this lake.

Cooking Lake's name is a calque of its Cree language name, .

References 

Cooking Lake
Strathcona County